The AN/PVS-7 is a single tube biocular night vision device. Third-generation image intensifiers are able to be installed and are standard for military night vision. Most newer PVS-7 intensifier tubes are auto-gated to prevent image intensifier damage if exposed to intense light. The goggles have a built-in infrared Illuminator for low-light situations. They are waterproof and charged with nitrogen to prevent internal condensation while moving between extreme temperatures. 

They were designed to replace the older AN/PVS-5 from the Vietnam War. Though slowly being phased out by the AN/PVS-14, the AN/PVS-7 is still being used by the United States Armed Forces with hundreds of thousands in service.

The designation AN/PVS translates to Army/Navy Portable Visual Search, according to Joint Electronics Type Designation System guidelines.

References

Night vision devices
Military electronics of the United States
Military equipment introduced in the 1980s